Kazbegi ( qazbegi) may refer to:

Places 

Kazbegi, a former name of Stepantsminda, a town in Georgia
Mount Kazbek, in the Caucasus
Kazbegi Municipality, a municipality in Georgia

People 

Kazbegi family, a noble family in Georgia
Alexander Kazbegi, Georgian writer
Kazbegi, Kazbek, or Kazi-Bek, a male given name in the Caucasus